Mateo Albéniz, also known as Mateo Antonio Pérez de Albéniz (c. 175523 June 1831) was a Spanish composer, theorist, and priest. He is not related to the better-known composer Isaac Albéniz, but he was the father of Pedro Albéniz. He is identified by the name Pedro Albéniz in some older biographical sources and was said to have died in 1821.

He was born in the Basque region. He held a post as Maestro de Capilla in San Sebastián and in Logroño from 1795 to 1800, when he returned to San Sebastián (where he died) until his retirement in 1829.

He composed masses, vespers, motets, and other church music, never published, and a book of solfeggi (published at St. Sebastian, 1800). Albéniz also wrote for the harpsichord and fortepiano. The work by which he is best known today is the Sonata in D major, of which a popular transcription for guitar has been made.

Notes

References

External links

1755 births
1831 deaths
Spanish male classical composers
Spanish Classical-period composers
Classical composers of church music
Catholic liturgical composers
Spanish organists
Male organists
18th-century classical composers
18th-century male musicians
18th-century musicians
18th-century keyboardists
19th-century classical composers
19th-century organists
19th-century Spanish male musicians